Turnip mosaic virus (TuMV) is a Potyvirus of the family Potyviridae that causes diseases in cruciferous plants, among others.  The virus is usually spread by 40-50 species of aphids in a non-persistent manner.  Infected plants, especially the natural hosts, show symptoms such as chlorotic local lesions, mosaic, mottling, puckering or rugosity.  TuMV is a positive-sense single stranded RNA virus, consisting of a non-enveloped, helical capsid that is filamentous and flexuous, with an average length of 720 nm.  The TuMV genome is linear and monopartite (single particle).  The virus has a thermal inactivation point (TIP) of 62 °C, and longevity in vitro (LIV) of 3–4 days.

Evolution
This virus probably evolved from a virus of wild orchids in Germany spreading to wild and domestic brassicas. Via Southern Europe it moved to Asia Minor within the last 700 years.

References

External links

Viral plant pathogens and diseases
Potyviruses